The Tinaroo Falls, a waterfall on the Barron River, is located in the below the Lake Tinaroo dam wall in Far North region of Queensland, Australia. 

The traditional custodians of the land surrounding the waterfall are the indigenous Yidinji people.

See also

 List of waterfalls of Queensland

References

Waterfalls of Far North Queensland